The Horton River, a perennial stream of the Barwon catchment within the Murray–Darling basin, is located in the Northern Tablelands and North West Slopes districts of New South Wales, Australia.

Course and features
The river rises on the northern slopes of the Nandewar Range, below Mount Kaputar, and flows generally southeast and north, joined by six tributaries before reaching its confluence with the Gwydir River, north west of Bingara; descending  over its  course.

The valley of the Horton River is used for grazing and some cropping.  It is a sparsely populated area with no significant towns.   There is a small village called Upper Horton.   The valley is traversed by the Narrabri-Bingara Road.  Other nearby towns, outside the valley, are Barraba, Bingara, and Narrabri.

The Horton River is a source of floodwater for the Gwydir River and Mehi River and can flood the town Moree.

See also

 Rivers of New South Wales
 List of rivers of Australia

References

External links
 

Rivers of New South Wales
Murray-Darling basin
Northern Tablelands